Corbeil-Essonnes on the River Seine is a commune in the southern suburbs of Paris, France.

Although neighboring Évry is the official seat of the Arrondissement of Évry, the sub-prefecture building and administration are located inside the commune of Corbeil-Essonnes.

History
Traces of human presence in the area date to the Palaeolithic and Neolithic ages; later it was a Gallo-Roman settlement on the main road from Paris to Sens. The name Corbeil is derived from the Latin Corbulium, from the Gaulish cor beel, meaning "holy house". Since the time of Aymon, comte de Corbeil (died 957), to the 12th century it was the chief town of a powerful county, which passed to Mauger, son of Richard I of Normandy.

William de Corbeil (died 1136) became archbishop of Canterbury, but nothing is known for certain about his parentage. The Gothic church was built in the tenth century and rebuilt in the fifteenth century.  Before the expulsion of the Jews Corbeil had a flourishing Jewish community, which numbered thirteenth-century scholars Isaac ben Joseph of Corbeil and  Perez ben Elijah. Peter of Corbeil (died 1222) was the teacher of Lotario de' Conti, who became pope as Innocent III.

Representatives of the king of France signed two treaties of Corbeil in the town, the Treaty of Corbeil (1258) between France and Aragon and the Treaty of Corbeil (1326) between France and Scotland.

Corbeil was besieged by the Duke of Burgundy in 1418.  The Protestants of France attacked it in 1562 amidst the religious war called the First Civil War. In 1590 General Alessandro Farnese, who had come to the assistance of the Catholics in France, fought at Corbeil.

The composer Camille Saint-Saëns lived in Corbeil for some years of his youth.

The commune of Corbeil-Essonnes was created on 10 August 1951 by the merger of the commune of Corbeil with the commune of Essonnes. The commune town hall (mairie) is located in Corbeil.

Inhabitants of Corbeil-Essonnes are known as Corbeil-Essonnois.

Population

The population data given in the table and graph below for 1946 and earlier refer to the former commune of Corbeil.

Economy

In the 19th century, Corbeil-Essonnes was a centre of the flour-milling industry. Essonnes also had notable papermills.

Today, X-Fab France SAS is headquartered here and operates a semiconductor fabrication plant. The  site includes 25000 square meters of cleanrooms and a design center. The fab had been founded by IBM in 1964. In 1999 it was transferred into a joint venture between IBM and Infineon, operating under the name Altis Semiconductor(fr). In 2010 it was sold to Yazid Sabeg for one symbolic Euro. X-Fab acquired the assets of insolvent Altis in 2016.

Safran Aircraft Engines has a plant in Corbeil.

Transport
Corbeil-Essonnes is served by Corbeil-Essonnes station which is an interchange station on Paris RER line D. Corbeil-Essonnes is also served by Essonnes-Robinson station and by Moulin-Galant station on Paris RER line D.

The town is crossed by the EuroVelo 3 track.

Education
There are about 40 schools in Corbeil-Essonnes.

Junior high schools:
 Collège Chantemerle
 Collège La Nacelle
 Collège Louise Michel
 Collège Saint-Spire
 Collège Sédar Senghor

Senior high schools/Sixth-form colleges:
 Lycée Robert Doisneau
 Lycée polyvalent Saint Léon

Notable people
Nigel Atangana, footballer
Jean-Sylvain Babin, footballer
Dylan Bahamboula, footballer
Demba Diagouraga, footballer 
Claude Dauphin, actor
Damien Mozika, footballer 
Félicien Rops (1833-1898) Belgian artist and illustrator 
Hadi Sacko, footballer
PNL, French rappers
MMZ, French rappers
William de Corbeil, medieval Archbishop of Canterbury
Walid Regragui, French-Moroccan football coach

Twin towns
 Alzira, Spain, since 1991
 Belinho e Mar (Esposende), Portugal, since 2000
 Bishopbriggs, Scotland, since 1989
 Sindelfingen, Germany, since 1961

See also
Communes of the Essonne department

References

External links

 Official website 
 website MJC of Corbeil-Essonnes 

Land use (IAURIF) 
Mayors of Essonne Association 

Communes of Essonne